Ronan David Jackson Vibert (23 February 1964 – 22 December 2022) was an English actor who was known for his appearances in films and on British and American television.

Early life
He was born in Cambridge, on 23 February 1964, the son of Dilys (née Jackson) and David Vibert, both artists. He lived in Penarth, South Wales until he was 18, then attended the Royal Academy of Dramatic Art, graduating in 1985.

Career
Vibert had a long career in theatre, radio, television and film.

Vibert appeared in episodes of Lovejoy, Chandler & Co, Between the Lines and the BBC's The Buccaneers, in ITV's Cadfael, Inspector Lewis and in Van der Valk. He appeared in Jeeves and Wooster as Wilmot, Lord Pershore ('Motty').

Stage credits included plays at the Bush Theatre, Hampstead Theatre, The Gate, Manchester Royal Exchange, Bristol Old Vic, The Barbican for the RSC, The Almeida and The Savoy West End. In 1996, Vibert appeared at the National Theatre for the third time, as Prince Andre in Helen Edmundson's adaptation of Leo Tolstoy's War and Peace. He played Maximilien Robespierre in the BBC's adaptation of The Scarlet Pimpernel with Richard E. Grant.

Vibert appeared in the Midsomer Murders episode "Death in Chorus". He also appeared in the Waking The Dead and The Mrs Bradley Mysteries.

He also appeared in such TV series as Rome, ITV's Poirot, The Borgias, Emmy award winning miniseries Hatfields and McCoys with Kevin Costner and Bill Paxton, Penny Dreadful, The Lizzie Borden Chronicles, NCIS LA, Phillip K Dick's Electric Dreams and Carnival Row.

Among his many films are Shadow of the Vampire with John Malkovich and Willem Dafoe, The Cat's Meow directed by Peter Bogdanovich, the Oscar-winning The Pianist directed by Roman Polanski, Tomb Raider 2, Tristan and Isolde, The Snowman with Michael Fassbender and Saving Mr Banks with Tom Hanks and Emma Thompson, portraying the publisher Diarmuid Russell. He also appeared in The Grass Arena with Mark Rylance.

Illness and death
Vibert died at a Florida hospital on 22 December 2022, aged 58, following a brief illness.

Filmography

Film and television

Radio

References

External links

Ronan Vibert at the British Film Institute
Ronan Vibert (Aveleyman)

1964 births
2022 deaths
Alumni of RADA
People from Cambridge
English male television actors
English male film actors
English male radio actors
English male voice actors
English male video game actors
Male actors from Cambridgeshire
English expatriates in Canada
English expatriates in the United States